Madan Bhandari Inner Terai Highway is an ongoing road project in Nepal, which is thought to be  long from east to west. It starts at Shantinagar in Jhapa District of Province No. 1 and runs through Inner Terai (Chure-bhawar) area. It ends at Rupal of Dadeldhura District of Sudurpashchim Province. It is an alternative road to East-west Mahendra Highway (NH-1). The highway will be located 25 to 30 km to the north of Mahendra Highway and 25 to 30 km south of the Pushpalal Highway.

The 315-kilometre-long section of the highway from Dharan to Hetauda had already been awarded and construction works are ongoing.

See also
Mahendra East-West Terai Highway
Pushpalal Mid Hill Highway

References

Highways in Nepal